Arauco is a department of La Rioja Province, Argentina.

Population
It had 723 inhabitants at the 2001 census, an increase of 16% since the last census in 1991, when it had 623 inhabitants.

Settlements
 Aimogasta
 Arauco
 Bañado de los Pantanos
 Estación Mazán
 Machigasta
 Termas de Santa Teresita
 Udpinango
 Villa Mazán
 San Antonio

Departments of La Rioja Province, Argentina